Hypermastus mareticola is a species of sea snail, a marine gastropod mollusk in the family Eulimidae.

Discovered by Daniel Ray Norris (1992) in Apra Harbor, Guam. H. mareticola was found as a parasite of the irregular sea urchin Maretia planulata.

References

External links

Eulimidae
Gastropods described in 1991